Simulant is an upcoming American thriller film directed by April Mullen. It stars Robbie Amell, Jordana Brewster, Simu Liu, Alicia Sanz, and Sam Worthington. The film is set to release in May 5, 2023.

Premise
A woman named Faye tries to replace her newly deceased husband, Evan, with an android simulant.

Cast
 Robbie Amell
 Jordana Brewster
 Simu Liu
 Alicia Sanz
 Sam Worthington

Production
In September 2021, Luke Grimes was announced to star. In December 2021, Sam Worthington and Jordana Brewster were added to the cast. In early 2022, Grimes dropped out of the project while Robbie Amell, Alicia Sanz, and Simu Liu joined the cast. Filming was underway in the Toronto area by February 2022.

References

External links
 

Upcoming films
American thriller films